Megachile asahinai is a species of bee in the family Megachilidae. It was described by Yasumatsu in 1955.

References

Asahinai
Insects described in 1955